Louise Marie-Therese may refer to:

Louise Marie-Therese (The Black Nun of Moret) (1664–1732)
Princess Louise Marie Thérèse of France (1819–1864)

Feminine given names